Tauna Kay Vandeweghe (born February 7, 1960) is an American former competition swimmer who participated in the 1976 Summer Olympics in Montreal, Quebec.  She competed in the 100-meter backstroke and advanced to the semifinals of the event, recording a best time of 1:05.00 in the preliminary heats.

Family
Vandeweghe is the daughter of NBA basketball player Ernie Vandeweghe and 1952 Miss America Colleen Kay Hutchins. Her brother Kiki Vandeweghe and uncle Mel Hutchins also played NBA basketball, and both were NBA All-Stars. With her first husband, she has a son, Beau, who played volleyball for the Pepperdine Waves, and daughter, Coco Vandeweghe, a professional tennis player.

See also
 List of University of California, Los Angeles people
 List of University of Southern California people

References

1960 births
Living people
American female backstroke swimmers
Olympic swimmers of the United States
Sportspeople from Los Angeles County, California
Swimmers at the 1976 Summer Olympics
UCLA Bruins women's swimmers
USC Trojans women's volleyball players
Vandeweghe family